The 1992 European Figure Skating Championships were held in Lausanne, Switzerland from January 21–26, 1992. Senior-level figure skaters from European ISU member nations competed in the disciplines of men's singles, ladies' singles, pair skating, and ice dancing.

Results

Men

Ladies

Pairs

Ice dancing

References

Inline 
European Figure Skating Championships, 1992
European Figure Skating Championships, 1992
European Figure Skating Championships
International figure skating competitions hosted by Switzerland
Sports competitions in Lausanne
20th century in Lausanne
January 1992 sports events in Europe

General